Michael D. Cohen may refer to:
 Michael D. Cohen (academic) (1945–2013), professor of complex systems, information and public policy at the University of Michigan
 Michael D. Cohen (actor) (born 1975), Canadian actor
 Michael Cohen (lawyer) (Michael Dean Cohen), American disbarred lawyer, an attorney for U.S. president Donald Trump

See also
 Michael Cohen (disambiguation)